Akira Aizawa (相澤晃, born 18 July 1997) is a Japanese long-distance runner.

On 4 December 2020, he won the 10,000m race at the Japanese national championships in a time of 27:18:75 at the Nagai Stadium, Osaka. In doing so, he broke the Japanese national record and ran the Olympic qualifying standard time to secure a place at his home 2020 Tokyo Olympics.

Personal bests
Outdoor
5000 metres – 13:29.47 (Tokyo 2021)
10000 metres – 27:18.75 (Osaka 2020)
Half marathon – 1:01:45 (Tachikawa 2019)

References

1997 births
Living people
Japanese male long-distance runners
Universiade gold medalists in athletics (track and field)
Universiade gold medalists for Japan
Medalists at the 2019 Summer Universiade
People from Sukagawa
Sportspeople from Fukushima Prefecture
Athletes (track and field) at the 2020 Summer Olympics
Olympic athletes of Japan
21st-century Japanese people